Cho Sang-jun (born 11 July 1999) is a Korean footballer currently playing as a forward for Seongnam FC.

Career statistics

Club

References

1999 births
Living people
South Korean footballers
South Korea youth international footballers
Association football forwards
K League 1 players
Suwon FC players
Ansan Greeners FC players